"Hundred Mile High City" is a song by British rock band Ocean Colour Scene, taken as the first single from their third studio album, Marchin' Already (1997). The song was released in 1997 and reached number four on the UK Singles Chart, becoming the band's joint most-successful single on the UK Singles Chart and their second-most successful in terms of number of weeks spent in the top 75, staying in for seven weeks. It was also their first single to chart in Ireland and the Netherlands, peaking at numbers 15 and 98, respectively.

In 1998, "Hundred Mile High City" appeared on the soundtrack to the black comedy crime film Lock, Stock and Two Smoking Barrels. After the film premiered in the United States the following year, the song was added to several US alternative radio stations in mid-March 1999.

Track listings

UK CD single
 "Hundred Mile High City"
 "The Face Smiles Back Easily"
 "Falling to the Floor"
 "Hello Monday"

UK 7-inch and cassette single
A. "Hundred Mile High City"
B. "The Face Smiles Back Easily"

European CD single
 "Hundred Mile High City"
 "Hello Monday"

Japanese CD single
 "Hundred Mile High City"
 "Travellers Tune"
 "Falling to the Floor"
 "Hello Monday"

Personnel
Personnel are taken from the UK CD single liner notes and the Marchin' Already album booklet.
 Ocean Colour Scene – writing, production, recording, mixing, engineering
 Simon Fowler – vocals, guitar
 Steve Cradock – guitar, piano
 Damon Minchella – bass guitar
 Oscar Harrison – drums
 Brendan Lynch – production, recording, mixing, engineering
 Martyn "Max" Heyes – production, engineering

Charts

Weekly charts

Year-end charts

Certifications

Release history

In popular culture
"Hundred Mile High City" was used as the theme to the film Lock, Stock and Two Smoking Barrels and the computer game Three Lions.

References

Ocean Colour Scene songs
1997 singles
1997 songs
MCA Records singles
Song recordings produced by Brendan Lynch (music producer)
Songs written by Damon Minchella
Songs written by Oscar Harrison
Songs written by Simon Fowler
Songs written by Steve Cradock